This is an updated list of equipment of the United Arab Emirates army currently in service.

Small arms

Artillery

Air Defense Weapons

Vehicles

Decommissioned equipment 

  Hwasong-5 - 25 (ordered 1989, decommissioned due to dis-satisfactory quality)

United Arab Emirates
Equipement
Equipment of the United Arab Emirates Army
Army

References 

United Arab Emirates
Equipement
Equipment of the United Arab Emirates Army
Army